The Esterhazy Madonna is an oil-on-canvas painting by Raphael, created c. 1508, held at the Museum of Fine Arts in Budapest, in Hungary. It was stolen on the night of 5 November 1983, along with other works by Raphael, Giorgione, Tintoretto and Tiepolo. All the works, including this one, were recovered by the Italian Carabinieri in an abandoned Greek convent near Aigio.

See also
List of paintings by Raphael
Operation Budapest

Bibliography 
Comando Carabinieri - TPC, Anno Operativo 2001, Edizioni De Luca, Roma 2001

References

External links

1508 paintings
Paintings of the Madonna and Child by Raphael
Paintings in the collection of the Museum of Fine Arts (Budapest)
Nude art